Architecture magazines and journals cover new architectural works, architects, and design. Architectural Forum, Architectural Record, and Architectural Review are among the oldest; each began publication in the 1890s.

English or multilingual

Australia
Architecture Australia, bi-monthly magazine published in Australia by the Australian Institute of Architects since 1915
POL Oxygen, Australian and international architecture and design (2001 – 2008)
Australia Architecture, Site is a publication and blog dedicated to showcasing Australia's best interior design and architecture.

Canada 
Åvontuura, architecture and travel 
Azure Magazine, architecture and design magazine based in Toronto

Croatia  
Oris, architecture and art

Ecuador 
Trama, architecture and design magazine based in Quito, Ecuador

Germany 
DETAIL, German-based international architecture magazine
Junk Jet, architecture

India 
Building Giants, Indian quarterly magazine, published by ABS Publication since 2010
Surfaces Reporter, incepted in 2011, is India’s 1st and only design e-zine and print magazine dedicated to materials and products for Interiors and Architecture. The monthly material-centric publication is finely focussed and dedicated to ideas and products that constitute the realm of building and designing the interiors.

Iran 
2A Magazine, architecture and art magazine based in Tehran

Israel 
Architecture of Israel, bilingual international - English/ Hebrew language magazine for architecture design and environment, published quarterly and online-only since 1988

Italy
Abitare, international architecture and design magazine (bilingual: Italian and English), published monthly since 1961
Casabella, Italian and international architecture magazine
Domus, Italian and international architecture magazine

The Netherlands  
A10 - new European architecture
Frame, international design
Volume Magazine, international architecture based in The Netherlands

New Zealand  
Design Review, New Zealand (1948–54)

Republic of Ireland  
Plan, architecture, design, art and urban planning

Spain 
 Arquitecturas Bis (1974–1985)
El Croquis, Spanish-English bi-monthly magazine publishing monographs, est. 1982

Thailand 
art4d, English-Thai monthly magazine for architecture, art and design in Southeast Asia, based in Bangkok since 1995

United Kingdom 
Architects' Journal, British weekly magazine
Architectural Design, UK-based architectural journal first launched in 1930 which today presents bi-monthly theme-based issues
Architectural Digest
Architectural Review, monthly, published in London since 1896
Blueprint, British architecture and design monthly established in 1983
Building Design, British weekly magazine, online-only since 2014
Icon Magazine, monthly architecture and design based in London
RIBA Journal, official journal of the Royal Institute of British Architects

United States  
Architect, a U.S. architecture magazine with focus on design, practice and technology
The Architect's Newspaper, founded in 2003 and published in New York, Los Angeles, and Chicago
Architectural Forum (1892–1974), also known as The Brickbuilder and The Magazine of Building
Architectural Record, an American magazine founded in 1891
Architecture, monthly published in New York by Forbes & Co., Ltd., from 1900 to 1917 and C. Scribner's Sons from 1917 to 1936
Architecture, monthly published in Washington, DC, by the American Institute of Architects from 1983 to 2006
ArchitectureWeek, international, English-language magazine of design and building, published weekly and online-only since 2000
The Classicist, annual journal of The Institute of Classical Architecture and Art which highlights New Classical Architecture, primarily buildings constructed in the United States
Dwell, architecture and lifestyle
Log, observations on architecture and the contemporary city published three times a year, based in New York City.
The Next American City, architecture, design, and urban planning
Metropolis Magazine, architecture and design
NESS Magazine, A magazine about architecture, life, and urban culture.
Progressive Architecture, architecture, design, and technology (1945-1995); subsumed by Architecture magazine, published by the American Institute of Architects
SOILED, periodical for architectural stories, based in Chicago, Illinois since 2011
Surface Magazine, architecture, design, and fashion

Other languages
AG magazin, Serbian magazine for construction
Baumeister, German monthly
Byggekunst, defunct Norwegian magazine
Deutsche Bauzeitung, German monthly
Summa+, architecture magazine in Spanish

References

Site Publication

 
Architecture